Home, Before and After is the eighth studio album by singer-songwriter Regina Spektor, released on June 24, 2022, through Sire and Warner Records. It was announced on February 22, 2022, along with the release of its lead single "Becoming All Alone" on streaming platforms.

Critical reception

Home, Before and After received positive reviews from contemporary music critics. At Metacritic, which assigns a normalized rating out of 100 to reviews from mainstream critics, the album has an average score of 77 based on 11 reviews, indicating "generally favorable reviews". Aggregator AnyDecentMusic?  gave it 7.7 out of 10, based on their assessment of the critical consensus.

Veteran critic Robert Christgau gave Home, Before and After an A-minus and said that, even though "she's not getting any happier [at 42]", "crafted song follows crafted song and thoughtful lyric enriches thoughtful lyrics", while "her sweet, modest, precise voice" surpasses "her classically trained piano" playing. Christgau also highlighted the cautionary narrative of "One Man's Prayer" and the reassuring one of the album closer "Through a Door".

Track listing
All tracks written by Regina Spektor.

Personnel 
Musicians
 Regina Spektor – vocals, piano, co-production (all tracks); keyboards (3, 5, 6, 8)
 John Congleton – synthesizer (all tracks), bass (1–3, 5, 7, 8), drum programming (1–3, 5, 9), percussion (1–3, 6), horns arrangement (2, 5), string arrangement (2, 3, 5), drums (3), electric guitar (3, 5, 7, 8); marimba, vibraphone (5); keyboards (6–8, 10), theremin (6)
 Luke Reynolds – bass (1, 8, 9); horns arrangement, string arrangement (1); electric guitar (3, 5, 6, 8), acoustic guitar (5), synthesizer (6)
 Skopje Studio Orchestra – orchestra (1–5, 7–9)
 Joey Waronker – percussion (1–3), drums (3, 5–9)
 Jherek Bischoff – horns arrangement (2, 4, 5), string arrangement (2, 4, 5, 7–9)
 Caleb Teicher – tap dancing (7)

Technical
 John Congleton – production, mixing, engineering
 Regina Spektor – co-production
 John Davis – mastering
 Ariel Shafir – engineering
 David Turk – engineering (7)

Charts

References 

2022 albums
Regina Spektor albums
Sire Records albums